I4, i4, I 4 or I-4 may refer to:

Arts, entertainment, and media
 I-4: Loafing and Camouflage, a Greek film

Military
 1st Life Grenadier Regiment (Sweden) (1816–1927), a Swedish infantry regiment
 , a World War II Type J1 submarine of the Imperial Japanese Navy
 Life Grenadier Regiment (Sweden) (1928–1997), a Swedish infantry regiment
 Tupolev I-4, a 1927 Soviet aircraft

Science and technology
 I-4 satellite
 i4, an integer in XML-RPC

Transportation
 I4 engine, a piston engine
 Interstate 4, an interstate highway in Florida
 BMW i4, a German mid-size electric sedan
 Interstate Airlines, by IATA airline designator
 LB&SCR I4 class, a British locomotive

See also
 iPhone 4, a smartphone